Indian Telly Award for Best Child Artiste - Male is an award given by Indiantelevision.com as part of its annual Indian Telly Awards for TV serials, to recognize a male child actor who has delivered an outstanding performance on television.

The award was first awarded in 2003 under the title TV Child Artiste of the Year for a performance by either sex.  Next year, it was officially divided into two separate categories to acknowledge both male and female actors individually.

List of winners

Child Artiste of the Year 
2001 Not Awarded
2002 Not Awarded
2003 Won by a female actor
2004 Zain Khan - Jassi Jaissi Koi Nahin as Rohan 
Yash Mittal - Khichdi as Jackie 
Kinshuk Vaidya - Shaka Laka Boom Boom as Sanju
Abbas Khandelwal - Shaka Laka Boom Boom as Klesha 
Smith Seth - Bachha Party as Rishi Gujral
2005 Yash Mittal - Khichdi as Jackie 
Darshil Mashru - Ruby Duby Hub Dub as Gochu  
Rahul - Guns & Roses as Vincent
Zain - Jassi Jaissi Koi Nahin as Rohan
2006 Dhruv - Kaisa Ye Pyar Hai as Prateek 
Rajat Tokas - Dharti Ka Veer Yodha Prithviraj Chauhan as Prithviraj Chauhan
Smith Seth - Baa Bahoo Aur Baby as Manav Thakkar 
Abhileen Pandey - Jabb Love Hua as Chottu
2007 Rajat Tokas - Dharti Ka Veer Yodha Prithviraj Chauhan as Prithviraj Chauhan 
Smith Seth - Baa Bahoo Aur Baby as Manav Thakkar
Adityansh - Hero - Bhakti Hi Shakti Hai as Bakyay Babu
Shyam Sharma - Banoo Main Teri Dulhann as 
Dev Kantawala - Vicky & Vetaal as Vicky Sharma
2008 Krish Karnavat - Main Teri Parchhain Hoon as Sachin 
Avinaash Mukherjee - Balika Vadhu as Jagadish
Dhriti Bhatia - Jai Shri Krishna as Krishna
Smith Seth - Baa Bahoo Aur Baby as Manav Thakkar 
Varun Shukla - Kumkum – Ek Pyara Sa Bandhan as Sumit
2009 Avinash Mukherjee- Balika Vadhu as Jagya 
Dhriti Bhatia - Jai Shri Krishna as Krishna
Siddharth Gupta - Maat Pitaah Ke Charnon Mein Swarg as Shubh
Adarsh - Mahavir Hanuman 
Bhavya Gandhi - Taarak Mehta Ka Ooltah Chashmah as Tapu
2010 Bhavya Gandhi - Taarak Mehta Ka Ooltah Chashmah as Tapu 
Avinaash Mukherjee - Balika Vadhu as Jagadish 
Nikunj Padaya - Mrs. & Mr. Sharma Allahabadwale as Dabbu
Devarsh Amit Thaker - Tere Liye as Anurag
Tapasvi Mehta - Ishaan: Sapno Ko Awaaz De as Ishaan
2011 No Award
2012 Raj Mange - Jai Jai Jai Bajrang Bali as Hanuman 
Paras Arora - Veer Shivaji as Shivaji Maharaj 
Bhavya Gandhi - Taarak Mehta Ka Ooltah Chashmah as Tapu 
Aryan Sharma - Diya Aur Baati Hum as Chotu
Rushiraj Pawar - Chandragupt Maurya as Chandragupt Maurya
2013 Bhavesh Balchandani - Ek Veer Ki Ardaas...Veera as Veer 
Sadhil Kapoor - Devon Ke Dev...Mahadev as Ganesh
Raj Mange - Jai Jai Jai Bajrang Bali as Hanuman 
Dev Joshi - Baal Veer as Baal Veer
Divyam Dama - Punar Vivaah as Ansh Yash Sindhia
Shivansh Kotia - Yeh Rishta Kya Kehlata Hai as Naksh
 2014 Faisal Khan - Bharat Ka Veer Putra – Maharana Pratap as Young Mharana Pratap
Bhavesh Balchandani - Ek Veer Ki Ardaas...Veera as Veer
Shivansh Kotia - Yeh Rishta Kya Kehlata Hai as Naksh
Vishesh Bansal - Buddhaa - Rajaon Ka Raja as Young Siddharth
Dev Joshi - Baal Veer as Veer
 2015 Siddharth Nigam - Chakravartin Ashoka Samrat as Ashoka
 Ishant Bhanushali - Sankatmochan Mahabali Hanuman as Bal Hanuman
 Dev Joshi - Baal Veer as Veer
2019 Krish Parekh - Tenali Rama as Gundappa
2021 Krish Parekh - Tenali Rama as Gundappa

See also 

 Indian Telly Award for Best Child Artiste - Female

References

Indian Telly Awards